Elisenda Pérez (born 28 January 1975) is a Spanish former medley swimmer who competed in the 1992 Summer Olympics.

References

1975 births
Living people
Spanish female medley swimmers
Olympic swimmers of Spain
Swimmers at the 1992 Summer Olympics
Mediterranean Games gold medalists for Spain
Mediterranean Games medalists in swimming
Swimmers at the 1991 Mediterranean Games